Kris Goossens (born 20 February 1974) is a former professional tennis player from Belgium.

Career
Goossens entered into the ATP's top 100 for the first time in 1995, after making the semi-final of the Swedish Open and winning a Challenger event in Ecuador. His run to the semi-finals in Sweden including a win over world number 24 Jonas Björkman.

Also that year, he played two Davis Cup singles rubbers for Belgium, against the Russian team. He lost both of his matches, to Yevgeny Kafelnikov and Andrei Chesnokov.

He entered the main draw of seven Grand Slams but only once reached the second round. That occurred at the 1996 French Open, where he defeated Tim Henman. In the following round he lost to Guy Forget, in a five set match.

ATP Challenger and ITF Futures finals

Singles: 13 (7–6)

Doubles: 8 (5–3)

Performance timeline

Singles

References

External links 
 
 

1974 births
Living people
Belgian male tennis players
People from Uccle
Sportspeople from Brussels